The Campeonato Paraibano is the football league of the state of Paraíba, Brazil.

Format
As in any other Brazilian soccer championship, the format can change and be adapted every year, mostly to avoid conflicts for the teams that will compete at a national level.

The 2013 season was played in two stages, the first being a round-robin tournament and the second being based on play-off matches.

List of champions

Following is the list with all champions of Campeonato Paraibano.

Liga Parahybana de Football

Federação Desportiva Parahybana

Federação Paraibana de Futebol

Notes

Titles by team

Teams in bold stills active.

By city

References

  
Paraibano